Trimeresurus andersonii is a venomous pitviper species endemic to the Andaman Islands of India.
Common names include: Nicobar mangrove pit viper, Anderson's pitviper, and Andaman pit viper.

Etymology
The specific name, andersonii, is in honor of Scottish zoologist John Anderson, who worked in India 1864-1886 and was the first curator of the Indian Museum in Calcutta (now called Kolkata).

Geographic range
T. andersonii is found only in the Andaman Islands of India. The type locality given by Theobald (1868) is "No record", which was restricted to "Andaman Islands" by Regenass and Kramer (1981).

References

Further reading

Das I (1999). "Biogeography of the amphibians and reptiles of the Andaman and Nicobar Islands, India". pp. 43–77. In: Ota H (editor) (1999). Tropical Island Herpetofauna ... Amsterdam: Elsevier. 353 pp. .
Malhotra A, Thorpe RS (1996). "New perspectives on the evolution of south-east Asian Pit Vipers (genus Trimeresurus) from molecular studies". pp. 115–128. In: Thorpe RS, Wüster W, Malhotra A (editors) (1996).Venomous Snakes: Ecology, Evolution and Snakebite. Oxford, England: The Zoological Society of London / Clarendon Press. 296 pp. .
Smith MA (1943). The Fauna of British India, Ceylon and Burma, Including the Whole of the Indo-Chinese Sub-region. Reptilia and Amphibia. Vol. III.—Serpentes. Secretary of State for India. (Taylor and Francis, printers.) London. xii + 583 pp. (Trimeresurus purpureomaculatus andersoni, pp. 521–522).
Theobald W (1868). "Catalogue of Reptiles in the Museum of the Asiatic Society of Bengal". J. Asiatic Soc. Bengal 37 ("Extra Number"): vi + 7-88. ("Trimeresurus Andersoni", new species, pp. 75–76).

External links
 

andersonii
Reptiles of India
Fauna of the Andaman and Nicobar Islands
Endemic fauna of India